Thammalangka or Lord of the White Elephant is the third son of Chao Pha Chai Keaw and princess Chandadevi.  He was born in 1746.  He joined his brothers, Kawila, Khamsom, Duangthip, Moola, Khamfan, and Bunma to unite Lanna with Siam in 1774. In 1805, Rama I promoted him to be the Uparaja of Chiangmai when Kawila was a ruler. In 1816, Kawila died, he was promoted to be the ruler of Chiangmai.  Khamfan, his younger brother who was the ruler of Lamphun became Uparaja of Chiang Mai.  Bunma became the ruler of Lamphun.  When they went to Bangkok, he gave a white elephant to Rama II and received the name Chao Phraya Chang Pueak Thammalangka. During his reign, he renovated the temples and city walls and created three canals for the people in Chiangmai city.  He ruled Chiangmai for six years.  He died on 4 May 1822 at the age of 77.

Reign

Religion 
He built Inthakhin Temple in Pasang with Kawila in 1794.  In 1817, he built Wat Phra That Sri Chomthong and renovated Wat Phra Singh.  In 1819, he arranged a great celebration in Wat Umong, Wat Duangdee, Wat Sapao, and Wat Phantao and renovated Wat Banping, Wat Dokkham, Wat Chiang yeun, and Wat Bupharam.  He created wall for Wat Phra That Sri Chomthong.  In 1820, he paid respect to Wat Phra Buddha See Roy and built a temple.  He paid respect to Wat Phra Bath Khuang Pao.  He created a Big Buddha in Wat Phra Singh.  In 1822, he made a merit to celebrate Wat Chedi Luang and ordained at Wat Chiangman.  Next year, he invited special Buddhas from abandoned temple outside  the city wall into temples in the city wall.

Created canals 
In 1817, he ordered the officials and people to dig three canals for people in the city.  The first canal started from Jang Hua Lin to Jang Sri Phum and turn to Jang Khatum.  The second canal was dug along main road in front of Wat Dubphai to Wat Phra Singh.  The third canal was dug along the west battlements toward the south passing the north of Hoa Khum and turned toward Jang Khatum in front of Wat tsaimoon.

Fixed City walls 
It was built since Kawila's reign in 1796.  The fix was begun by dumping the moats since Jang Goo Reung until Hai ya gate in 1818.  The actual fix of city wall began in 1820.  The built began in the morning with the 19 monks from Wat Phra Singh to perform the blessing.

Titles
 1746 - 1774: Prince Thammalangka
 1774 - 1782: Phraya Rachawong of Lampang
 1782 - 1816: Uparaja of Chiangmai
 1816 - 1822: Ruler of Chiangmai

References

1746 births
1822 deaths
Rulers of Chiang Mai
Chet Ton dynasty
19th-century Thai people
18th-century Thai people
19th-century Thai monarchs